JK Piraaja is Estonian football club based in Tallinn which was founded in 1998. It is one of the oldest football clubs in Estonia. Currently they are playing in the II liiga East/North, fourth-highest division in the Estonian football and Sportland Arena is their home stadion.

Statistics

League and Cup

References

External links
Official website 
Team at Estonian Football Association
Club's official Facebook page

Praaja Tallinn
Association football clubs established in 1998
1998 establishments in Estonia